Toomas Kivimägi (born 16 February 1963 in Lihula, Lääne County) is an Estonian politician and lawyer. He has been a member of the XIII and XIV Riigikogu.

In 1986 he graduated from University of Tartu, studying the law. In 1990, he became the lawyer of the Pärnu County Agriculture Department. From 1992 until 1993, he was the Vice County Governor of Pärnu. From 7 December 1993 until 18 November 2009, Kivimägi was the County Governor of Pärnu, and from 19 November 2009 until 30 March 2015, he was the Mayor of Pärnu. On 1 March 2015, he was elected a member of the Riigikogu.

Since 2014 he is a member of Estonian Reform Party.

References

1963 births
20th-century Estonian lawyers
Estonian Reform Party politicians
Living people
Mayors of Pärnu
Members of the Riigikogu, 2015–2019
Members of the Riigikogu, 2019–2023
Members of the Riigikogu, 2023–2027
People from Lääneranna Parish
Recipients of the Order of the White Star, 3rd Class
University of Tartu alumni